Douglas Garnet Robinson (born August 27, 1940) is a Canadian former ice hockey player. He played 240 games in the National Hockey League (NHL) with the Chicago Black Hawks, New York Rangers and Los Angeles Kings from 1964 to 1971. Robinson's son, Rob Robinson, also played in the NHL.

Playing career
Robinson started his NHL career with Chicago, and also played for New York and Los Angeles. In 240 NHL regular season games, he scored 44 goals and had 67 assists for a career total of 111 points with 36 penalty minutes. In 11 NHL playoff games he recorded 4 goals and 3 assists, for a total of 7 points.

Career statistics

Regular season and playoffs

External links
 

1940 births
Living people
Baltimore Clippers players
Canadian ice hockey left wingers
Chicago Blackhawks players
Ice hockey people from Ontario
Los Angeles Kings players
New York Rangers players
Nova Scotia Voyageurs
Sault Thunderbirds players
Guelph Biltmore Mad Hatters players
Seattle Totems (WHL) players
Sportspeople from St. Catharines
Springfield Kings players